Paley and Austin were the surnames of two architects working from a practice in Lancaster, Lancashire, England, between 1868 and 1886.  The practice had been founded in 1836 by Edmund Sharpe.  The architects during the period covered by this list are E. G. Paley and Hubert Austin.  E. G. Paley had joined Edmund Sharpe in partnership in 1845.  This partnership continued until 1851, when Sharpe retired, and Paley ran the business as a single principal until he was joined by Hubert Austin in 1868.  The partnership of Paley and Austin continued until they were joined as a partner by Paley's son, Henry Paley, in 1886.

This list covers the non-ecclesiastical works executed by the practice during the partnership of Paley and Austin; the period from 1868 to 1886.  These include new houses and alterations to houses (which varied in size from large country mansions to tenement blocks), railway stations, schools and alterations to schools, banks, industrial buildings, hospitals, and a bridge. Because of the location of the practice, most of their non-ecclesiastical work was in the areas that are now Cumbria, Lancashire, and Greater Manchester, but examples can also be found in Cheshire, Yorkshire, Merseyside, County Durham, Buckinghamshire, and Wales.

Key

Works

References
Citstions

Sources

Gothic Revival architecture
Paley and Austin